1cP-AL-LAD is an analog of lysergic acid diethylamide (LSD) which has psychedelic effects and is thought to act as a prodrug for AL-LAD. It has been sold as a designer drug, first identified in France in June 2021.

See also 
 1cP-LSD
 1D-LSD
 1P-AL-LAD

References 

Lysergamides
Cyclopropyl compounds
Carboxamides